Homalium ceylanicum is a species of tree which grows up to 30 metres tall. It has buttressed roots. It is cultivated as an ornamental tree and for its wood, which can be used commercially.

References

External links
 Photochemical Analysis

ceylanicum